Rosalyn Fairbank-Nideffer and Raffaella Reggi-Concato were the defending champions, but none competed this year. Reggi-Concato retired from professional tennis at the end of the 1992 season.

Isabelle Demongeot and Elna Reinach won the title by defeating Jill Hetherington and Kathy Rinaldi 6–2, 6–4 in the final.

Seeds

Draw

Draw

References
 Official results archive (ITF)
 Official results archive (WTA)

ASB Classic - Women's Doubles
WTA Auckland Open